Cold Case is an American police procedural crime drama television series. It ran on CBS from September 28, 2003, to May 2, 2010. The series revolved around a fictionalized Philadelphia Police Department division that specializes in investigating cold cases.

Premise
The show is set in Philadelphia, Pennsylvania, and follows Detective Lilly Rush (Kathryn Morris), a homicide detective with the Philadelphia Police Department, who specializes in cold cases, or investigations which are no longer being actively pursued by the department.  Rush was initially partnered with Detective Chris Lassing (Justin Chambers) in the first five episodes and then with Detective Scotty Valens (Danny Pino) for the remainder of the series.  They work under Lieutenant John Stillman (John Finn) and are assisted by other detectives from their squad—Nick Vera (Jeremy Ratchford), Will Jeffries (Thom Barry), and beginning in season three, Kat Miller (Tracie Thoms).

Usually, each episode would focus on a single investigation.  All cases involved murders committed in Philadelphia, although investigations occasionally required travel outside the city.  Cases were also spread out over much of the previous century, with some as recent as a year or two old and others dating back to the 1910s.  Generally, an investigation would begin when the police received a new lead, or new direction, on a case.

Over the course of the episode, the detectives would interview witnesses associated with the crime and piece together the story of what led the victims to their death. These interviews were accompanied by flashback sequences to the time of the murder which dramatized the testimony. Through the flashbacks, the show examined many issues related to 20th century history, including racism, homophobia, transphobia, sexism, abortion, and police brutality.

The show was distinguished by double casting, in which the characters and witnesses would flash back and forth in the scene representing them as they looked at the time of the crime and in the present day. At the end of the episode, when the killer or killers were exposed and confronted, the confession would be in a flashback scene depicting the murder. The police would be shown arresting the killer and walking them into custody.

Music
The theme song is an excerpt from "Nara" by E.S. Posthumus, with an introduction by series composer Michael A. Levine that begins with an otherworldly wail from vocalist Elise Morris. Besides Levine's original music, each episode makes extensive use of era-appropriate music for flashbacks to the year in question. Some episodes contain music only from one artist such as Ray Charles, U2, Radiohead, Bruce Springsteen, Nirvana, Pearl Jam, The Doors, John Mellencamp, Johnny Cash, Bob Seger, Aerosmith, Pink Floyd, Tim McGraw, Bob Dylan, Santana, Frank Sinatra and John Lennon. Pearl Jam's music was used in the two-part season-six finale, the first time one artist's music has been used for two full episodes.

Cast and characters

 Kathryn Morris as Lilly Rush, a Homicide Detective. Lilly first investigates a cold case during episode 1 of the series, and later continues to do so at her own request. In this capacity, Rush becomes the lead detective of the cold case division.
 Justin Chambers as Chris Lassing, a detective. Lilly's original partner (Season 1).
 Danny Pino as Scotty Valens, a detective. Lilly's second partner.
 John Finn as John Stillman, a lieutenant and the head of Philadelphia Homicide Division. 
 Jeremy Ratchford as Nick Vera, a detective assigned to Homicide. 
 Thom Barry as Will Jeffries, a senior detective, and Philadelphia Homicide Division's assistant-supervisor.
 Tracie Thoms as Kat Miller, a narcotics detective who later joins as a homicide detective (Seasons 3–7).

Fictional universe 
Danny Pino appeared as Valens in the CSI: NY episode “Cold Reveal”. This episode connected Cold Case to not only CSI: NY, but also to CSI: Miami, CSI: Crime Scene Investigation, CSI: Cyber, and Without a Trace.

Adaptations

Japanese adaptation
A Japanese remake of the series, set in Yokohama, was broadcast on cable network WOWOW Prime from October 22, 2016, to December 24, 2016. A second season was broadcast from October 13, 2018, to December 15, 2018, and a third season was broadcast from December 5, 2020, to February 13, 2021. The second and third seasons are filmed in 8K and downscaled to 4K for broadcast.

Russian adaptation
Company Star Media produced Russian adaptation of the series (broadcast in Russia under the title Detective Rush) named Without Prescription. The show consists of 25 episodes.

Satire
In 2005, John Finn, Kathryn Morris and Jeremy Ratchford appeared in a satirical promo on the Irish-language television station TG4. The commercial won a gold medal in the "Best Drama Promos" category of the 2007 Sharks International Advertising Awards Festival of Ireland (Sharks Awards). The promotion features John Finn and Kathryn Morris in character interrogating a murder suspect (Peader Cox) from the TG4 soap Ros na Rún who refuses to speak in English; both detectives then begin talking in Gaelic, much to the surprise of Jeremy Ratchford's character. The promo tied in with a murder investigation in Ros na Rún.

Cold Squad controversy

At the launch of Cold Case in July 2003, a Canadian journalist asked the launch panel about similarities between Cold Case and a Canadian series called Cold Squad which had debuted five years earlier. Cold Squad fans accused the American series of copying the Canadian program's basic premise and characters. In 2003, the Cold Squad creators considered seeking legal redress against the Cold Case producers over copyright issues. Both shows air in Canada (and on the same network, CTV). In November 2003, the law firm O'Donnell & Schaeffer, which had successfully represented Art Buchwald in his copyright-infringement suit against Paramount and who has defended the James Bond franchise against copycats, confirmed it agreed to represent the Cold Squad producers, who claim the CBS series was a copy of their own hit show. The Globe and Mail reported that Meredith Stiehm, the American series creator, attended a TV writing seminar at the Canadian Film Centre in 2002 where the Cold Squad concept was discussed. O'Donnell lawyer, Carole Handler stated: "Our clients are very concerned about many striking similarities and have retained counsel to investigate the situation and, if necessary, to take appropriate action."

Episodes

U.S. television ratings
Note: Each U.S. network television season starts in late September and ends in late May, which coincides with the completion of May sweeps.

 In season 3 episode "A Perfect Day" Cold Case set a series rating record by attracting an audience of 19.36 million viewers.

Cancellation
Cold Case began in September 2003 and quickly became a staple of the CBS Sunday night schedule. The crime drama had a successful first season and, by season two, was averaging a 3.5 rating in the 18–49 demographic and 15.1 million viewers. For the next couple seasons, total viewership fell slightly but the demographic numbers rose, reaching a 3.8 in season four.

In season five, the show averaged a 2.9 rating and just under 11 million viewers and ranked 28th. In Season 6, the ratings sank lower, to an average of a 2.7 rating but climbed up to 12 million viewers and ranked 20th; CBS made a choice between renewing Without a Trace and Cold Case. They chose to keep Cold Case. The real ratings trouble began in the final season when the show's ratings dropped even further to a 2.15 rating in the 18–49 demographic and 9.6 million viewers. One reason for this is that the show aired at 10:00 pm, the ratings dropped 25% to 9 million viewers. On November 22, 2009, CBS made a final attempt to increase the ratings by scheduling Cold Case at 9:00 pm. The ratings increased to 10 million viewers, but it was short-lived because on February 14, 2010, Cold Case returned to its original schedule, at 10:00 pm and the ratings dropped and the show concluded its run in May 2010 ranking 29th and more than two weeks after the series finale aired, CBS announced the show would not be renewed for an eighth season.

On May 18, 2010, CBS announced the cancellation of the series after seven seasons and 156 episodes.

Since it had become customary to end each season with a cliffhanger, season 7's final episode, "Shattered", ended leaving viewers wondering about the fates of several characters. The cancellation of the show left those questions unresolved.

Distribution

Broadcast 
The series aired in syndication on CBS, and also on Ion Television in the U.S. and on Viva in Canada. Sleuth also aired the series occasionally. In 2011, the show aired on MyNetworkTV. The show made its debut on the new over-the-air channel Start TV when it launched on September 3, 2018. It also airs on MBC Action. As of 2022, reruns are often shown on TNT channel.

Home media and streaming
Since the program's debut in 2003, none of the seven seasons have ever been released on DVD or Blu-ray due to licensing issues related to the use of contemporary music in each episode.

In May 2020, the Roku Channel in the U.S. released all episodes of Cold Case to stream for the first time on its platform, in a high-definition digital format, with full subtitles and all contemporary music from the original CBS broadcasts left intact. The streaming would end in December 2020 after it was extended from an October end date.

Cold Case is currently available for streaming on HBO Max as of November 23, 2022.

As of September 2021, all seasons of Cold Case (with subtitles as well as all music from the original broadcasts) are once again streaming on The Roku Channel.

All seasons of Cold Case are available to stream on Amazon Prime in the United Kingdom, Australia, Canada & India.

Awards and nominations

Awards
ASCAP Award
 Top TV Series – (2004)
 Top TV Series – (2005)
 Top TV Series – (2006)
 Top TV Series – (2007)
 Top TV Series – (2008)
 Top TV Series – (2009)

GLAAD Media Awards
 Outstanding Individual Episode (In a Series Without a Regular Gay Character) – For episode "Best Friends". (2006)

Image Awards
 Outstanding Directing in a Dramatic Series – Paris Barclay (2006)

Imagen Foundation Awards
 Best Actor, Television – Danny Pino (2010)

Nominations
ALMA Awards
 Outstanding Actor in a Drama Television Series – Danny Pino (2008)

ASC Awards
 Outstanding Achievement in Cinematography in Regular Series (For episode "Time To Hate") (2004)

Excellence in Production Design Award
 Television – Single Camera Television Series (For episode "Factory Girls") (2005)

CDG Awards
 Outstanding Costume Design for Television Series – Period/Fantasy (2005)
 Outstanding Costume Design for Television Series – Period/Fantasy (2006)
 Outstanding Costume Design for Television Series – Period/Fantasy (2007)

GLAAD Media Awards
 Outstanding Individual Episode (In a Series Without a Regular Gay Character) (For episode "A Time to Hate") (2004)
 Outstanding Individual Episode (In a Series Without a Regular Gay Character) (For episode "It's Raining Men") (2005)
 Outstanding Individual Episode (In a Series Without a Regular Gay Character) (For episode "Daniela") (2005)
 Outstanding Individual Episode (For episode "Forever Blue") (2007)
 Outstanding Individual Episode (in a Series without a Regular LGBT Character) (For episode "Boy Crazy")

Emmy
 Outstanding Art Direction for a Single-Camera Series – Corey Kaplan, Sandy Getzler, & Timothy Stepeck (2005)

Soundtrack
A soundtrack CD was released in 2008 by Lakeshore Records, featuring incidental music composed by Michael A. Levine from the first four seasons, as well as the song 300 Flowers, sung by Robbyn Kirmsse.

See also 
 Television in the United States
 The Enigma Files, UK / BBC Two, 1980
 Cold Case Files, USA / A&E, 1999 (true cases)
 Waking the Dead, UK / BBC One, 2000
 New Tricks, UK / BBC One, 2003
 NCIS, USA / CBS, 2003
 Solved, USA / ID, 2008 (true cases)
 Zettai Reido, Japan / Fuji Television, 2010
 Cold Justice, USA / TNT, 2013 (true cases)
 To Catch a Killer, CAN / OWN, 2014 (true cases)
 Signal, South Korea / TVN, 2016
 Signal, Japan / Fuji TV, 2018

References

External links

 
 
 

 
2000s American crime drama television series
2000s American mystery television series
2000s American police procedural television series
2003 American television series debuts
2010s American crime drama television series
2010s American mystery television series
2010s American police procedural television series
2010 American television series endings
CBS original programming
English-language television shows
Fictional portrayals of the Philadelphia Police Department
Ghosts in television
Television franchises
Television series by CBS Studios
Television series by Warner Bros. Television Studios
Television shows set in Philadelphia
Police procedurals